The 2014–15 season is twenty-third season for NK Zagreb in the Prva HNL.

First-team squad

Source:, Last updated unknown

League table

References

Zagreb
NK Zagreb seasons